In computer science, a Wirth–Weber relationship between a pair of symbols  is necessary to determine if a formal grammar is a simple precedence grammar. In such a case, the simple precedence parser can be used. The relationship is named after computer scientists Niklaus Wirth and Helmut Weber.

The goal is to identify when the viable prefixes have the pivot and must be reduced. A  means that the pivot is found, a  means that a potential pivot is starting, and a  means that a relationship remains in the same pivot.

Formal definition

Precedence relations computing algorithm
We will define three sets for a symbol:
  

The pseudocode for computing relations is:

 RelationTable := ∅
 For each production 
 For each two adjacent symbols  in 
 add(RelationTable)
 add(RelationTable)
 add(RelationTable)
 add(RelationTable) where  is the initial non terminal of the grammar, and $ is a limit marker
 add(RelationTable) where  is the initial non terminal of the grammar, and $ is a limit marker

Examples

 Head(a) = ∅
 Head(S) = {a, c}
 Head(b) = ∅
 Head(c) = ∅
 Tail(a) = ∅
 Tail(S) = {b, c}
 Tail(b) = ∅
 Tail(c) = ∅
 Head(a) = a
 Head(S) = {a, c}
 Head(b) = b
 Head(c) = c
 
 a Next to S
 
 
  
  
 S Next to S
 
 
  
  
 
  
  
  
  
 S Next to b
 
 
  
  
 
 there is only one symbol, so no relation is added.

precedence table

Further reading
 

Formal languages